The Story of a Little Parisian (French: Totte et sa chance, German: Der Sprung ins Glück, Italian: La storia di una piccola Parigina) is a 1928 silent film directed by Augusto Genina. It was made as a co-production between France, Germany and Italy.

The film's art direction was by Otto Erdmann and Hans Sohnle.

Cast
   Carmen Boni as Totte  
 André Roanne as Renato Gavard  
 Hermann Vallentin as Gavards Vater  
 Carla Bartheel as Nénesse  
 Lya Christy as Lucette  
 Hans Junkermann as Ein alter Graf  
 Magnus Stifter as Diener  
 Oreste Bilancia as Loysel, Sekretär  
 Max Lentlos as Julien, Friseur  
 Ossip Darmatow as Lebemann  
 Loni Nest as Lehrmädchen  
 Anton Pointner 
 Angelo Ferrari 
 Rosa Valetti

References

Bibliography
 Parish, James Robert. Film Actors Guide. Scarecrow Press, 1977.

External links

1928 films
1920s Italian-language films
Films directed by Augusto Genina
Italian silent films
German silent feature films
French silent feature films
Films of the Weimar Republic
Films produced by Seymour Nebenzal
National Film films
German black-and-white films